Aulae or Aulai may refer to:
Aulae (Caria), a town of ancient Caria, now in Turkey
Aulae (Cilicia), a town of ancient Cilicia, now in Turkey
Aulae (Lycia), a town of ancient Lycia, now in Turkey